Rohe is a village in Jõgeva Parish, Jõgeva County in eastern Estonia.

References

 

Villages in Jõgeva County